Gustav Mahler: Dark Flame is an album by Uri Caine featuring interpretations of music by Gustav Mahler which was released on the Winter & Winter label in 2003.

Reception

In his review for Allmusic, Alex Henderson notes that "Caine celebrates Mahler on his own terms on this consistently intriguing CD".

Writing in JazzTimes, Andrew Lindemann Malone observed "When Caine responds to the melodies, rhythms and texts of Mahler's originals, he doesn't merely change his own rhythms and melodies, as jazzmen have since time immemorial, but changes styles completely-and since Mahler embraced an eclectic style himself, Caine can really pull out anything he can think of".

Track listing
All compositions by Uri Caine after Gustav Mahler
 "Dark Flame" - 11:03
 "Only Love Beauty" - 2:57
 "In Praise of Lofty Judgement" - 3:08
 "Two Blue Eyes" - 9:51
 "Shining Trumpets" - 7:53
 "The Lonely One in Autumn" - 4:51
 "Song of the Prisoner in the Tower" - 8:06
 "When My Sweetheart..." - 8:39
 "Labor Lost" - 3:18
 "On Youth" - 3:34
 "Rhinelegend" - 3:20
 "When Your Mother Comes in the Door" - 1:14
 "St. Anthony of Padua Preaches to the Fishes" - 6:16
 "Only Love Beauty" - 2:44

Personnel
Uri Caine - piano  (tracks 1, 3-5, 7-9, 11-14)
Ralph Alessi - trumpet (tracks 1, 3-5, 7-9, 11, 13 & 14)
Don Byron - clarinet (tracks 1, 3-5, 7-9, 11, 13 & 14)
Tao Chen - dizi (tracks 6 & 10)
Yi Zhou - pipa (track 10)
Mark Feldman - violin (tracks 1, 3-5, 7-9, 11, 13 & 14)
David Gilmore - guitar (track 7)
Bao-Li Zhang - erhu (track 10)
Sisi Chen - yang quin (tracks 6 & 10)
DJ Olive - turntables, electronics (tracks 1, 3-5, 7 & 8)
Michael Formanek - bass (tracks 1, 3-5, 8, 9, 11, 13 & 14)
Jim Black - drums
Kettwiger Bach Chor conducted by Wolfgang Kläsener 
Aaron Bensoussan (tracks 4 & 8), Sadiq Bey (track 9), Shulamith Wechter Caine (track 4), Tong Qiang Chen (track 6), Julie Patton (tracks 1 & 7) - voice
Sepp Bierbichler (tracks 3, 7, 11 & 12), Barbara Walker (track 2) - vocals

References

Winter & Winter Records albums
Uri Caine albums
2003 albums